Abdelilah Bagui (born 17 February 1978) is a  Moroccan former footballer.

Bagui played for FC Spartak Moscow and FC Rostov in the Russian Premier League.

Career statistics

International

Statistics accurate as of match played 12 January 2008

References

External links
Profile at kawkabi.com 

1978 births
People from Fez, Morocco
Living people
Moroccan footballers
Morocco international footballers
Association football goalkeepers
Maghreb de Fès players
FC Spartak Moscow players
Raja CA players
FC Rostov players
Kawkab Marrakech players
Chabab Rif Al Hoceima players
Olympic Club de Safi players
KAC Kénitra players
Botola players
Russian Premier League players
2002 African Cup of Nations players
2008 Africa Cup of Nations players
Moroccan expatriate footballers
Expatriate footballers in Russia
Moroccan expatriate sportspeople in Russia